Events in the year 1240 in Norway.

Incumbents
Monarch: Haakon IV Haakonsson (along with Haakon Haakonsson)

Events
24 May – The civil war era in Norway ends.

Arts and literature

Births

Exact date missing
 Audun Hugleiksson, nobleman (died 1302).

Deaths
24 May – Skule Bårdsson, nobleman (born c. 1189).

References

Norway